Fog Bay is a small bay immediately west-north-west of Terror Point in Windless Bight, on the south side of Ross Island, Antarctica. It was so named in July 1911 by the winter journey party, led by Edward Adrian Wilson of the British Antarctic Expedition, 1910–13, because of the thick white fog they encountered there.

References 

Bays of Ross Island